Stenanthemum notiale is a species of flowering plant in the family Rhamnaceae and is native to Western Australia, South Australia and Victoria. It is a small, erect to prostrate shrub with hairy young stems, egg-shaped leaves with the narrower end towards the base, and clusters of white to cream-coloured or greenish yellow, densely shaggy-hairy flowers.

Description
Both surfaces of the leaves are sometimes covered with soft or shaggy hairs, or otherwise glabrous.

Taxonomy and naming
Stenanthemum notiale was first formally described in 1995 by Barbara Lynette Rye in the journal Nuytsia from specimens collected by Eric Jackson near the Young River crossing on the Ravensthorpe - Esperance road in 1968. The specific epithet (notiale) means "southern", referring to the species' distribution in three southern Australian states.

In the same journal, Rye described two subspecies of S. notiale and the names are accepted by the Australian Plant Census:
 Stenanthemum notiale subsp. chamelum Rye forms a ground cover, its leaves with up to 3 teeth near the tip, the upper surface minutely pimply or with sparse, minute hairs.
 Stenanthemum notiale  Rye subsp. notiale Rye has a more erect habit, its leaves with a rounded tip, the upper surface always hairy.

Distribution and habitat
Subspecies chamelum grows in heath and shrubland, usually over limestone, and is found on the coastal plain between Lancelin and Perth in the Geraldton Sandplains and Swan Coastal Plain bioregions of south-western Western Australia.
Subspecies notiale grows in woodland, heath and mallee and is widely distributed between Geraldton and Israelite Bay in Western Australia, and on the Eyre Peninsula in South Australia. There are also a few records from near Hattah and in the Wyperfeld National Park in north-western Victoria.

Conservation status
Stenanthemum notiale and both subspecies of S. notiale are listed as "not threatened" in Western Australia, by the Government of Western Australia Department of Biodiversity, Conservation and Attractions. Subspecies notiale is classified as "endangered" under the Victorian Government Flora and Fauna Guarantee Act 1988.

References

notiale
Rosales of Australia
Flora of Western Australia
Flora of South Australia
Flora of Victoria (Australia)
Plants described in 1995
Taxa named by Barbara Lynette Rye